Dash Bolaq Kandi (also Romanized as Dāsh Bolāq Kandī; also known as Dāsh Bolāgh Kandeh) is a village in Salavat Rural District, Moradlu District, Meshgin Shahr County, Ardabil Province, Iran. At the 2006 census, its population was 209, in 45 families.

References 

Towns and villages in Meshgin Shahr County